Otter is an unincorporated community in Paris Township, Union County, Ohio, United States.

Before 1900, there was a railroad station located here on the Western Division of the Toledo and Ohio Central Railway, but never a post office. The railroad station was discontinued on May 26, 1954.

References 

Unincorporated communities in Union County, Ohio